Lloyd James Austin FBA  (4 November 1915 – 30 December 1994) was an Australian linguist and literary scholar, who worked in Great Britain as a university teacher.

Life and work 

Lloyd Austin studied at the University of Melbourne under Alan Rowland Chisholm and, with a French Government scholarship, at the University of Paris from 1937 under the supervision of Maurice Levaillant. There on 3 April 1940 he presented his doctorate entitled Paul Bourget: sa vie et son œuvre jusqu'en 1889 (Paris: Librairie E. Droz, 1940), setting out for Australia shortly thereafter with his French wife, a graduate in English from the Sorbonne, on one of the last boats to leave France. He taught first of all in a school in Melbourne, served in the war from 1942 to 1945 and after the war was appointed to a lectureship at the University of St Andrews in Scotland. In the early 1950s he spent an extended period of research in Paris, taking up a position in 1956 as Professor of Modern French Literature at the University of Manchester in succession to Percy Mansell Jones (1889–1968). In 1961 he moved to Cambridge and in 1967 succeeded Lewis Charles Harmer to the Drapers Chair of French, at the University of Cambridge.

He served as General Editor of French Studies from 1967 to 1980.

From 1980 Austin succeeded Eugène Vinaver as foreign member of the Académie royale de langue et de littérature françaises de Belgique He in turn was succeeded by Robert Darnton.

He married Jeanne-Françoise Guérin in 1939 and they had three sons (including the photographer James Austin and the scholar of ancient Greek Colin Austin) and one daughter.

Other works 

 L'Univers poétique de Baudelaire. Symbolisme et symbolique, Paris: Mercure de France, 1956
(ed. with Henri Mondor) Correspondance de Mallarmé, 11 vols., Paris: Gallimard, 1959–1985
(ed. with Garnet Rees and Eugène Vinaver) Studies in modern French literature presented to P. Mansell Jones by pupils, colleagues and friends, Manchester: Manchester University Press, 1961
(ed. with Henri Mondor) Les « Gossips »  de Mallarmé: « Athenaeum » 1875–1876, Paris: Gallimard, 1962
Poetic Principles and Practice: Occasional Papers on Baudelaire, Mallarmé and Valéry, Cambridge: Cambridge University Press, 1987 
(ed.) Poésies de Stéphane Mallarmé, Paris: Flammarion (GF 504), 1989 
 Essais sur Mallarmé, ed. Malcolm Bowie, Manchester: Manchester University Press, 1995

Bibliography 
 Bowie, Malcolm, Alison Fairlie and Alison Finch (eds) Baudelaire, Mallarmé, Valéry: New essays in honour of Lloyd Austin. Cambridge: Cambridge University Press, 1982  
 Scott, C., "Lloyd James Austin: 1915–1994", Proceedings of the British Academy, 1995, 90, 267–79
 "Studies in memory of Lloyd James Austin", Australian Journal of French Studies, Monash University, 1995, 32, 3
 Obituary in French Studies 49, 1995, pp. 247–8

Honours 
 Elected to the British Academy in 1968
 Awarded honorary doctorate from the Sorbonne in 1973
 Appointed Officier de l'Ordre National du Mérite in 1976
 Elected to the Académie royale de langue et de littérature françaises de Belgique in 1980

External links 
 Académie royale de langue et littérature françaises de Belgique : Lloyd Austin
 Lloyd Austin obituary in the Independent
 Lloyd Austin obituary in French Studies

Notes 

1915 births
1994 deaths
University of Melbourne alumni
Fellows of Jesus College, Cambridge
Fellows of the British Academy
Members of the Académie royale de langue et de littérature françaises de Belgique
Professors of the University of Cambridge